This is a list of airports in Saudi Arabia, grouped by type and sorted by location.

Saudi Arabia, officially the Kingdom of Saudi Arabia, is the largest Arab country of the Middle East. It is bordered by Jordan and Iraq on the north and northeast, Kuwait, Qatar, Bahrain and the United Arab Emirates on the east, Oman on the southeast, and Yemen on the south. The Arabian Gulf lies to the northeast and the Red Sea to its west. The capital and largest city is Riyadh.

Saudi Arabia's busiest airport at Jeddah is used heavily during the Hajj season.



Airports 

Airport names shown in bold have scheduled passenger service on commercial airlines.

See also
 Transport in Saudi Arabia
 List of airlines in Saudi Arabia
 List of airports by ICAO code: O#OE - Saudi Arabia
 Wikipedia:WikiProject Aviation/Airline destination lists: Asia#Saudi Arabia

References

 Presidency of Civil Aviation
 
 
  - includes IATA codes

Saudi Arabia

Airports
Airports
Saudi Arabia